Seh Chah or Sehchah may refer to various places in Iran:
 Seh Chah, Bushehr
 Seh Chah, Eqlid, Fars Province
 Seh Chah, Jolgah, Jahrom County, Fars Province
 Seh Chah, Khafr, Jahrom County, Fars Province
 Seh Chah, Kuhak, Jahrom County, Fars Province
 Seh Chah, Faryab, Kerman Province
 Seh Chah, Rudbar-e Jonubi, Kerman Province
 Seh Chah, Kohgiluyeh and Boyer-Ahmad